Styan may refer to:

 Andy Styan
 Frederick William Styan